"La Mejor Versión de Mí" is a song by Dominican singer Natti Natasha. It was released on February 11, 2019, as the fourth single from her debut studio album, Iluminatti. On October 3, 2019, a bachata remix version featuring Dominican-American singer Romeo Santos was released. The song was listed as one of Billboards seven Latin songs taking a stance against domestic violence.

Music videos
A music video for the original song was released in February 2019. It shows Natti emotionally singing in front of a black background setting. The music video was compared to Gwen Stefani's "Used to Love You" video. The video has over 125 million views as of April 2020.

The music video for the remix version featuring Romeo Santos was released on October 3, 2019. Directed by Fernando Lugo, the videoclip shows Natti and Romeo in somber settings, such as Santos being trapped in a car that is sinking underwater and Natti in front of a burning car. The music video has over 300 million views on YouTube as of April 2020.

Charts

Weekly charts

Year-end charts

Certifications

References

2019 songs
2019 singles
Natti Natasha songs
Romeo Santos songs
Pina Records singles
Sony Music Latin singles
Songs written by Rafael Pina
Songs written by Romeo Santos
Spanish-language songs
Songs about domestic violence